Rhynchoferella kuehnei is a moth in the family Copromorphidae. It is found in Kenya.

References

Endemic moths of Kenya
Copromorphidae